Kyle Turris (born August 14, 1989) is a Canadian former professional ice hockey centre. He was selected third overall in the 2007 NHL Entry Draft by the Phoenix Coyotes. He has also played with the Ottawa Senators, Oulun Kärpät, Nashville Predators and Edmonton Oilers.

Playing career

Early career
As a youth, Turris played in the 2002 Quebec International Pee-Wee Hockey Tournament with a minor ice hockey team from North Vancouver.

As a 16-year-old in the British Columbia Hockey League (BCHL), Turris scored 72 points in 57 games for the Burnaby Express in 2005–06 and was awarded the Bruce Allison Memorial Trophy for the Coastal Conference as rookie of the year. The following year, he finished second in BCHL scoring with 121 points and was named the Coastal Conference's Most Valuable Player. Adding 26 points in 14 games, Turris led the Express to the BCHL championship, advancing to the 2006 Royal Bank Cup, Canada's national Junior A championship. He scored a hat-trick in the final game against the Yorkton Terriers of the Saskatchewan Junior Hockey League (SJHL) and led the tournament in scoring as the Express won the championship.

Named the 2007 Canadian Junior A Player of the Year, he was ranked first overall among North American skaters by Central Scouting and third among all skaters by International Scouting Services for the upcoming draft. In the subsequent 2007 NHL Entry Draft, he was drafted third overall by the Phoenix Coyotes, behind Patrick Kane and James van Riemsdyk. Turris stands as the highest ever drafted Tier II Junior "A" player since the level's inception by the Canadian Amateur Hockey Association in 1970.

Turris had the option of playing major junior rather than Junior A, as his Western Hockey League (WHL) rights were held by the Vancouver Giants, but he opted to stay with the Express so that he could play collegiate hockey in the U.S. once eligible. Accordingly, Turris joined the Wisconsin Badgers of the NCAA's Western Collegiate Hockey Association in 2007–08 and recorded a team-high 35 points in 36 games. While at the University of Wisconsin, Turris' roommate was Ryan McDonagh, who went on to play with the New York Rangers.

Professional career

Phoenix Coyotes
After Turris's season in Wisconsin ended, he signed an entry level contract with the Phoenix Coyotes on March 31, 2008, and joined the team for their final three games of the season. He made his NHL debut on April 3 against the Dallas Stars and recorded his first point, an assist, in his third game on April 6 against the Anaheim Ducks.

Starting 2008–09 with the Coyotes the following season, Turris scored his first NHL goal on October 12, 2008, digging a rebound out from under goaltender Jean-Sébastien Giguère's pad in a 4–2 win against the Anaheim Ducks.

After becoming a restricted free agent on July 1, 2011, failed contract negotiations with the Coyotes resulted in Turris holding out for the start of the 2011–12 season. With Turris absent from Phoenix's training camp, ESPN reported in September 2011 that Turris had requested a US$3–4 million salary. His demands caused speculation in the media he wanted to be traded from the team. By late October, a month into the season, Turris' agent, Kurt Overhardt, confirmed the player had requested a trade, asserting contract negotiations had "never been about money". Turris agreed to a two-year, $2.8 million contract with the Coyotes on November 22, 2011.

Ottawa Senators
On December 17, 2011, Turris was traded to the Ottawa Senators in exchange for David Rundblad and a second-round pick in the 2012 NHL Entry Draft. He registered an assist in his first game with Ottawa, a 4–1 victory over the Buffalo Sabres on December 20, 2011. On April 18, 2012, Turris scored two minutes into the first overtime period, earning the Senators a come-from-behind 3–2 victory over the New York Rangers, as well as their first home playoff win since Game 3 of the 2007 Stanley Cup Finals against the Anaheim Ducks. After establishing new career highs in goals (12), assists (17) and points (29) in his first season in Ottawa, Turris agreed to a five-year, $17.5 million contract extension with the club in late August 2012. From 2012 to 2016, Turris had at least one point during each of the team's season-opening games. Turris finished the 2016-17 season with a career-high 27 goals. The Senators advanced to the Eastern Conference Finals during the 2017 playoffs, but were eliminated in seven games by the eventual Stanley Cup champions, the Pittsburgh Penguins. In 19 playoff games that year, Turris recorded 4 goals and 10 points.

Nashville Predators

Entering the 2017–18 NHL season, Turris and the Senators had not reached agreement on a new contract. On November 5, 2017, Turris was traded to the Nashville Predators in a three-team trade that also included the Colorado Avalanche. The Senators acquired Matt Duchene from the Avalanche, while Colorado acquired Samuel Girard, Vladislav Kamenev and a 2018 second-round pick from the Predators, as well as Andrew Hammond, Shane Bowers and 2018 first- and third-round picks from the Senators. Turris was immediately signed to a six-year, $36 million contract extension. In his Predators' debut, he scored and recorded an assist in a 5–4 win over the Pittsburgh Penguins.

On October 7, 2020, Turris was placed on unconditional waivers for the purpose of a buyout by the Predators. The following day, Turris cleared waivers, making him a free agent for the first time in his career. Turris had four years remaining on his contract that carried an annual cap hit of $6 million. His buyout would save the Predators $4 million in cap space in each of the next four seasons, but add a cap charge of $2 million in each of the following four years.

Edmonton Oilers
On October 9, 2020, Turris signed a two-year, $3.3 million contract with the Edmonton Oilers.

Retirement
On August 17, 2022, it was announced Turris had been hired by the Coquitlam Express as special advisor to the general manager and as a player development coach, marking an end to his playing career.

International play

In the 2005 World U-17 Hockey Challenge, Turris earned a silver medal playing for Canada Pacific. The following year, he received gold with Team Canada at the 2006 Ivan Hlinka Memorial Tournament

Early in his second season in the BCHL, Turris competed in the inaugural 2006 World Junior A Challenge, an international Junior A tournament. Playing with Canada West, he led the tournament in scoring and was named tournament MVP as Canada West won the gold medal over Canada East. At the end of the 2006–07 season, he competed in the 2007 IIHF World U18 Championships with Canada, although the nation failed to medal.

Several months later, Turris played in the 2007 Super Series, an eight-game challenge series between Russia and Canada's national under-20 teams. He led the series in goal scoring with seven as Canada won the series with a 7–0–1 record. In the eighth and final game, held in his hometown of Vancouver, Turris scored two goals and was named the game's MVP.

In 2008, Turris led Canada in scoring at the World Junior Championships in the Czech Republic en route to a gold medal.

On May 12, 2018, Turris was named to represent the senior Canadian team at the IIHF World Championship in Denmark, finishing out of medal contention.

On April 29, 2019, Turris returned to represent Canada in the following 2019 IIHF World Championship held in Slovakia. He was selected as team captain heading into the commencement of the Tournament on May 10, 2019. Turris led Canada's progression through to the playoff rounds before losing the final to Finland to finish with the Silver Medal on May 26, 2019. He finished the tournament posting 4 goals and 10 points in as many games.

Personal life
Turris was born to Bruce and Vikky Turris in New Westminster, British Columbia. Bruce Turris is a retired lacrosse player, inducted into the Canadian Lacrosse Hall of Fame as a former member of the Western Lacrosse Association's Vancouver Burrards.

Turris graduated high school from St. Thomas More Collegiate in Burnaby, British Columbia. Growing up, he excelled in numerous sports. He was a member of the junior New Westminster Salmonbellies lacrosse team and also played the position of quarterback for three years before focusing on hockey full-time.

Turris lists Steve Yzerman as his favourite hockey player growing up, and Jack Johnson and Kings of Leon as his favourite music.

Turris served as honorary captain of the Capital City Condors, a family of ice hockey teams based in Ottawa for those ages six and up who are unable to play on any other hockey team due to a developmental disability. He and his wife, Julie, volunteered with the team on a regular basis and had lent their support to many of the Condors events, including the annual Kyle Turris Capital City Condors Golf Classic.

Turris and his wife Julie have three children: two sons and a daughter.

Career statistics

Regular season and playoffs

International

Awards and honours

References

External links
 

1989 births
Arizona Coyotes draft picks
Burnaby Express players
Canadian ice hockey centres
Edmonton Oilers players
Ice hockey people from British Columbia
Living people
Nashville Predators players
National Hockey League first-round draft picks
Ottawa Senators players
Oulun Kärpät players
Phoenix Coyotes players
San Antonio Rampage players
Sportspeople from New Westminster
Wisconsin Badgers men's ice hockey players